Cinthia Anais Zarabia Pulgar (born 24 November 1992) is a Venezuelan professional footballer who plays as a midfielder. She was a member of the Venezuela women' national team.

International career
Zarabia played for Venezuela at senior level in the 2010 Central American and Caribbean Games. She was also a part of the roster for the 2018 Copa América Femenina, but did not play.

References

External links
 

1992 births
Living people
People from Calabozo
Venezuelan women's footballers
Women's association football midfielders
Women's association football forwards
Caracas F.C. (women) players
Unión Magdalena footballers
Atlético Junior footballers
Atlético Huila (women) players
ÖFB-Frauenliga players
Campeonato Brasileiro de Futebol Feminino Série A1 players
Venezuela women's international footballers
Competitors at the 2010 Central American and Caribbean Games
Central American and Caribbean Games medalists in football
Central American and Caribbean Games gold medalists for Venezuela
Venezuelan expatriate women's footballers
Venezuelan expatriate sportspeople in Colombia
Expatriate women's footballers in Colombia
Venezuelan expatriate sportspeople in Austria
Expatriate women's footballers in Austria
Venezuelan expatriate sportspeople in Brazil
Expatriate women's footballers in Brazil